Rohozec is name of several locations in the Czech Republic:
Rohozec (Brno-Country District)
Rohozec (Kutná Hora District)